Lucille McVey (April 18, 1890 – November 3, 1925) also known as Mrs Sidney Drew, was an American screenwriter, director, producer, and actress. In the early 1900s, she was part with her husband Sidney Drew of the famous comedy duo Mr. and Mrs. Sidney Drew.

Biography

Early career 
Lucille McVey was born in Sedalia, Missouri, on April 18, 1890. From the age of 15, she worked as a comedian and was recognized as a foremost "child dialect reader". She went for a screen career in 1911 at the age of 21. At that time she was credited under the pseudonym of Jane Morrow, her grandmother's name.

In the early 1914, she joined the Vitagraph Studios where she met Sidney Drew and joined his company of players. In April 1914, she and the other members of the company accompanied Drew to Florida for a stay of six weeks, which started the beginning of their personal and working relationship.

Their marriage on July 25, 1914, led to the creation of Mr. and Mrs. Sidney Drew comedies.

Mr. and Mrs. Sidney Drew 

Like many women of the period, such as Lillian Gish or Margery Wilson, McVey pursued opportunities to write and direct. She started producing comedies with her husband under the name Mr. and Mrs. Sidney Drew. They occupied their own unit at the Vitagraph Studios. Soon they specialized in what came to be known as "polite" or "refined" domestic comedies also called high-brow comedies - or situation comedies according to the current terminology. They found their humor in the small misunderstandings affecting the bourgeois people.

Their first big success, Playing Dead (1915), was a five-reel "human interest drama" based on Richard Harding Davis's book. Sidney Drew directed it and Lucille McVey was credited as screenwriter. Following this success, they became a famous duo applauded by audience and the industry.

At the time, comedy shorts were paid per productions, not yearly. The 1918 crisis affecting the Vitagraph Studios forced the Drews to fly to Metro Pictures, who became their distributor. They continued producing short domestic comedies for $90,000 a year, releasing one one-reel comedy a week. During that time they perfected their Henry and Dolly characters, who will remain the central players of their productions from this point on.

At the expiration of their Metro's contract, they decided to temporally retire from the screen and returned to the stage with Keep Her Smiling, a lightweight comedy in which they both starred. In August 1918, they signed a contract with Amadee J. Van Beuren to produce a series of two-reel comedies released by Paramount while touring for Keep her Smiling.

In 1919, the Drews became independent producers, owner of V.B.K. Corporation, distributed by Famous Players-Lasky Corporation (Paramount Pictures Corporation). They slowed down the production to one or two comedies a month.

During the spring 1918, Sidney Drew's son from his first marriage, S. Rankin Drew, died while serving with the Lafayette Flying Corps, leading to the deterioration of Drew's health. Sidney Drew died on April 9, 1919.

Personal career 

Lucille McVey kept making films from her own New-York studio. Merely a year after Sidney Drew's death, Pathé Exchange sold a series of six to eight two-reel comedies made by McVey-Drew based on the After Thirty stories penned by Julian Stuart. It is still unclear whether or not McVey made more than the first two films, The Charming Mrs. Chase (1920) and The Stimulating Mrs. Barton (1920).

In 1921, she began to write, direct and produce series of short domestic comedies for the Vitagraph Studios. Cousin Kate (1921), a five-reel feature based on the play from Hubert Henry Davies, starred Vitagraph biggest star Alice Joyce and was acclaimed by critics and audience. She was one of the four women to direct at Vitagraph Studios after 1916 with Marguerite Bertsch, Lillian Josephine Chester and Paula Blackton.

She died of extended illness in 1925 at the age of thirty-five.

Artistic collaboration 

According to contemporary sources, Lucille Mcvey was the central creator of the Mr. and Mrs. Sidney Drew comedies. Despite her relative inexperience at her debut, she produced and directed more often than her husband and her input had an important impact on duo's creation.

She selected the ideas and developed them. She would look through incoming manuscript as they were send to the couple and reconstruct the script to give it its final shape. After two years of producing, only six comedies were made from a single author, the others from different writers all across America. The Drews bought scenarios only for the idea, believing that no author could "fit [their] particular methods."

For McVey, the essential of their ideas needed to be clear and thoughtful, inspired and based on real people and event. "Story must be real", she declared at the Photoplay in 1917. They based their stories mostly on married life, which offered a multiplicity of themes while being a "great part of the human". Subsequently, they mostly played husband and wife characters.

Lucille McVey bared the importance of the intimate in characters. The Mr. and Mrs. Sidney Drew comedies were mostly based on the use of subtitles. She believed they were "direct and human", helping to "get the story started and put continuity over quickly and speedily".

The Drew style was defined by the use of everyday situations of the bourgeois class turned into comical short comedies which was greatly acclaimed by the audience at their time.

Selected filmography

Short films

Play

See also 
 Mr. and Mrs. Sidney Drew

References

External links 

 
 
 

1890 births
1925 deaths
American women screenwriters
20th-century American actresses
People from Sedalia, Missouri
Film directors from Missouri
Film producers from Missouri
American film actresses
Women film pioneers
Screenwriters from Missouri
American women film producers
20th-century American women writers
20th-century American screenwriters